George Drummond was a Scottish footballer who played in the Scottish League for Leith Athletic as a centre forward.

Personal life 
Drummond's brother Jock and nephew Tom were both footballers for Cowdenbeath.

Career statistics

Honours 
Hearts of Beath

 Wemyss Cup: 1906–07

Individual

Cowdenbeath Hall of Fame

References

Scottish footballers
Cowdenbeath F.C. players
Scottish Football League players
Date of death missing
Year of birth missing
Place of death missing
1912 deaths
Association football forwards
Scottish emigrants to the United States
Leith Athletic F.C. players
Raith Rovers F.C. players
Hearts of Beath F.C. players